Vladimir Nikolayevich Solovyov (Russian: Владимир Николаевич Соловьёв; born 21 November 1946) is a Soviet rower from Russia. He competed at the 1972 Summer Olympics in Munich with the men's coxed four where they came fourth.

References

1946 births
Living people
Soviet male rowers
Olympic rowers of the Soviet Union
Rowers at the 1972 Summer Olympics
Rowers from Saint Petersburg